East Point Military Reservation was a World War I and World War II coastal defense site located in Nahant, Massachusetts. In 1955–62 it was a Nike missile launch site. As of 2016 most of the site is the Marine Science Center of Northeastern University.

History
The East Point Military Reservation was originally acquired by the US Army from the Lodge family in 1917. It originally consisted of a searchlight and an observation post. The site was planned to be named Fort Henry Cabot Lodge for the prominent senator on whose land part of the facility was built, but this was never acted upon.

The site today
The site today consists of towers, the foundations of buildings, and bunkers formerly for guns and ammunition.

East Point Batteries

The East Point Batteries, located in Nahant, Massachusetts, were part of the Harbor Defenses of Boston during World War II. Three separate gun batteries were built: Battery Murphy (two 16-inch guns), Battery 206 (two 6-inch guns), and a temporary 2-gun battery of 155 mm artillery. Along with these guns were three related fire control towers: two on Swallow Cave Rd. and one on Nahant Rd., plus a large underground plotting room behind Battery Murphy that served that battery's two big guns. In addition, to the north were fire control towers at 291 Ocean Avenue in Marblehead and Smiths Point in Manchester. Also, the northern series of Navy-operated magnetic loop cables, emplaced to detect enemy vessels (particularly U-boats) approaching Boston Harbor, terminated on the shore just southeast of the two 155mm gun positions. This was indicator loop Station 1D. All of these facilities were located in the area called East Point, at the extreme southeast end of the Nahant tombolo, as shown in the map at right. After 1943, these guns, together with the two 12-inch guns of Battery Gardner at Fort Ruckman, made Nahant the most heavily armed portion of Boston's coast defenses.

The Guns
Battery Murphy was one of a series of 16-inch gun emplacements that were installed near U.S. harbors before and during World War II. Construction on this battery commenced on 23 January 1942 and was completed just under two years later, on 18 December 1943. The guns were housed in casemates, part of a large bunker for magazines and fire control equipment.

Battery 206 was a 6-inch gun battery of a type designed to complement the World War II 16-inch batteries. The battery was built in 1942–43, concurrently with Battery Murphy. A large bunker between the guns housed magazines and fire control equipment.

The battery of two 155mm guns was made up of 155 mm M1918 towed guns emplaced on so-called "Panama mounts", 10-foot diameter concrete pads surrounded by circular steel rails 40 feet in diameter that carried the trails of the guns.

 This battery was a stopgap measure, put in place quickly between March and May 1942, as an emergency defense against enemy ships and submarines while the batteries of larger guns and their related fire control towers were being built. From the extreme southeast end of East Point, these guns, with their 12-mile maximum range, could command the entire ocean front of Boston Harbor and could reach all the way south to Hingham, MA.

The guns, which could be fired rapidly, were mounted roughly 250 feet apart, and a small, wooden Battery Commander's station, containing a depression position finder and a coincidence range finder was built between them. (See the image gallery below for plans and dimensions of this battery.) This 155mm gun battery is believed to have been the only one of its type in the Boston Harbor defenses, and the surviving platform of Gun 1 is thought to be relatively rare in New England.

Fire Control Structures
 In addition to having one of the largest concentrations of coast artillery in New England, East Point featured the largest concentration of fire control towers, used to direct and correct the fire of these guns.

Postwar use
In 1948 the guns were removed and the site ceased to be a coast defense installation. In 1952–56 a four-gun 90 mm anti-aircraft battery was at the site. In 1955–62 the site was Nike missile site B-17L or B-17C. Northeastern University acquired the property in 1967.

Gallery of Additional Images

See also
 9th Coast Artillery (United States)
 241st Coast Artillery (United States)
 Seacoast defense in the United States
 United States Army Coast Artillery Corps
 List of military installations in Massachusetts

References

External links
 List of all US coastal forts and batteries at the Coast Defense Study Group, Inc. website

Installations of the U.S. Army in Massachusetts
East Point
Nahant, Massachusetts
Buildings and structures in Essex County, Massachusetts